33rd BSFC Awards
December 9, 2012

Best Film: 
Zero Dark Thirty
The 33rd Boston Society of Film Critics Awards, honoring the best in filmmaking in 2012, were given on December 9, 2012.

Winners

Best Film:
Zero Dark Thirty
Runner-up: Amour and Moonrise Kingdom
Best Actor:
Daniel Day-Lewis – Lincoln
Runner-up: Denis Lavant – Holy Motors
Best Actress:
Emmanuelle Riva – Amour
Runner-up: Deanie Ip – A Simple Life (Tao jie)
Best Supporting Actor:
Ezra Miller – The Perks of Being a Wallflower
Runner-up: Christoph Waltz – Django Unchained
Best Supporting Actress:
Sally Field – Lincoln
Runner-up: Emma Watson – The Perks of Being a Wallflower
Best Director:
Kathryn Bigelow – Zero Dark Thirty
Runner-up: Paul Thomas Anderson – The Master
Best Screenplay:
Tony Kushner – Lincoln
Runner-up: Wes Anderson and Roman Coppola – Moonrise Kingdom
Best Cinematography:
Mihai Mălaimare Jr. – The Master
Runner-up: Robert Yeoman – Moonrise Kingdom and Claudio Miranda – Life of Pi
Best Documentary:
How to Survive a Plague
Runner-up: The Queen of Versailles
Best Foreign-Language Film:
Amour • Austria/France/Germany
Runner-up: Holy Motors • France/Germany
Best Animated Film:
Frankenweenie
Runner-up: ParaNorman
Best Editing:
William Goldenberg and Dylan Tichenor – Zero Dark Thirty
Runner-up: William Goldenberg – Argo
Best New Filmmaker:
David France – How to Survive a Plague
Runner-up: Benh Zeitlin – Beasts of the Southern Wild
Best Ensemble Cast:
Seven Psychopaths
Runner-up: Moonrise Kingdom
Best Use of Music in a Film:
Moonrise Kingdom
Runner-up: Django Unchained

External links
2012 Winners

References

2012
2012 film awards
2012 awards in the United States
2012 in Boston
December 2012 events in the United States